Henry King (7 March 1855 – 22 May 1923) was an English-born Australian photographer, known for his studies of Australian Aboriginal people and his views of Sydney.  King was one of Australia's most significant early photographers, described by the Australian Photographic Review as "stand[ing] high in the esteem of the craft".

Life
Henry King was born in Swanage, Dorset, England, the son of a stonemason, William Isaac King 1832–1916 and his wife Eliza, née Tomes 1834–1912.  King's family emigrated to Australia arriving in December 1856.  In 1878 he married Elizabeth Lang.

King's career as a photographer began in the Sydney studio of J. Hubert Newman. From 1880 King had his owned studio, initially in partnership with William Slade, at 316 George Street Sydney. Between 1889 and 1894 King travelled widely in New South Wales and Queensland, making many photographic studies of Aboriginal Australians. These were generally half-length portraits, against a painted backdrop. King exhibited some of these portraits at the World Columbian Exposition at Chicago in 1893, receiving a bronze medal. 
King also printed and exhibited in Chicago many photographs from negatives taken by Reverend W.G. Lawes of people and scenes photographed in New Guinea and islands of the Pacific.

In later years he turned to landscape photography, using the dry-plate technique, and produced a great many scenic views of Sydney. He also photographed notable views around New South Wales, including scenes of Jenolan Caves taken using magnesium flares.

King died on 22 May 1923 aged 68, leaving his wife, a son and three daughters.  He was buried at Waverley Cemetery.

After King's death, many of his glass negatives were purchased by J. R. Tyrrell and passed to Consolidated Press Holdings. The Tyrrell Collection, which includes works by a number of Australian photographers, is now held by the Powerhouse Museum.

Exhibitions and honours

1904, the Australian Photographic Review  devoted an entire issue to King's photographs 
1975, the Australian Centre for Photography held an exhibition of his Aboriginal portraits 
 His work was commissioned and exhibited by both the Art Gallery of New South Wales and the Society of Artists, Sydney. 
 The Powerhouse Museum holds a collection of his photographs and 1,300 glass negatives.
 His work is held by the National Library of Australia

See also

 Photography in Australia
 Cinema of Australia
 John Watt Beattie 
 William Bland 
 Jeff Carter (photographer)
 Maggie Diaz 
 Ken G. Hall 
 Frank Hurley 
 Charles Kerry 
 David Perry (Australian filmmaker) 
 Ruby Spowart 
 Mark Strizic

References

External links
 National Film and Sound Archive, Australia 
 Tyrrell Photographic Collection, Powerhouse Museum 
 Photographic Collection, State Library of New South Wales 
 National Library of Australia- Pictures
Obituary in Australasian photo-review, Vol. 30 No. 10 (15 October 1923) pp523 via Trove

1855 births
1923 deaths
People from Swanage
English emigrants to Australia
Artists from Sydney
19th-century Australian photographers
20th-century Australian photographers